The Musée Grévin is a wax museum in Paris located on the Grands Boulevards in the 9th arrondissement on the right bank of the Seine, at 10, Boulevard Montmartre, Paris, France. It is open daily; an admission fee is charged. The musée Grévin also has locations in Montreal and Seoul.

History
The museum was founded in 1882 by Arthur Meyer, a journalist for Le Gaulois, on the model of Madame Tussauds founded in London in 1835  and named for its first artistic director, caricaturist Alfred Grévin. It is one of the oldest wax museums in Europe. Its baroque architecture includes a hall of mirrors based on the principle of a catoptric cistula in 2018, a young American author, composer, interpreter and designer, Krysle Lip was in charge of the artistic and esthetical transformation of the Hall of Mirrors  The hall of mirrors was built for the Exposition Universelle in 1900.
It was originally housed in the Palais des mirages designed by Eugène Hénard.

Attractions
The Musée Grévin now contains some 450 characters arranged in scenes from the history of France and modern life, including a panorama of French history from Charlemagne to Napoleon III and bloody scenes of the French Revolution, with the original wax figures of the late 19th and early 20th centuries witnessing their technical evolution. By contrast, the more contemporaneous movie stars, athletes, and international figures such as Albert Einstein, Mahatma Gandhi, Shah Rukh Khan, Pablo Picasso, Michael Jackson, Josephine Baker and Pope John Paul II use the modern techniques of modeling. The tableau of Charlotte Corday murdering Jean-Paul Marat created in 1889 includes the actual knife and bathtub used.

New wax characters are regularly added to the Museum among more than 2000 made since it opened. They include Zinedine Zidane, Jean Reno, Monica Bellucci, Jean Dujardin, Isabelle Adjani and Nolwenn Leroy.

Bollywood celebrities whose wax has been added include Shah Rukh Khan, Aishwarya Rai  and Ranveer Singh.

Grévin Montréal (2013)

Grévin Seoul (2015)

See also 
 List of museums in Paris
 Musée Grévin - Forum des Halles, an annex of the museum, opened from 1981 to 1996
 Dermatological wax museum of the Hôpital Saint-Louis.

Notes

External links
 
 Musée Grévin official site   
 Grévin Montréal official site 
 Wireimage gallery
 "France's Past Cast in Wax", The New York Times, November 8, 1987

Museums in Paris
Wax museums
Buildings and structures in the 9th arrondissement of Paris
History museums in France
1882 establishments in France
Museums established in 1882